The 1979 Turkish Airlines Ankara crash occurred on December 23, 1979, when a Turkish Airlines Fokker F28 Fellowship 1000  airliner, registration TC-JAT, named Trabzon, on a domestic passenger flight from Samsun Airport to Esenboğa International Airport in Ankara, flew into the side of a hill  near the village of Kuyumcuköy in Çubuk district of Ankara Province,  north-northeast of the destination airport on approach to landing.

The crew had deviated from the localizer course while on an ILS approach experiencing severe turbulence.

Crew and passengers
The aircraft had 41 passengers and four crew on board; 38 passengers and three crew were killed in the accident.

Aircraft
The aircraft, a Fokker F28 Fellowship 1000 with two Rolls-Royce RB183-2 "Spey" Mk555-15 turbofan jet engines, was built by Fokker with manufacturer serial number 11071, and made its first flight in 1973.

References

Turkish Airlines Ankara
Aviation accidents and incidents in Turkey
Turkish Airlines accidents and incidents
Turkish Airlines 1979
Turkish Airlines 1979
Turkish Airlines 1979
History of Ankara Province
Turkish Airlines Ankara Crash, 1979
1979 meteorology
December 1979 events in Europe
1970s in Ankara